Elizabeth Leila Ralston Fergusson (16 April 1867 – 12 February 1930) was a New Zealand nurse, midwife and poultry farmer. She was born in Balligmorrie, Ayrshire, Scotland, on 16 April 1867.

References

1867 births
1930 deaths
New Zealand farmers
New Zealand women farmers
New Zealand nurses
New Zealand midwives
People from South Ayrshire
New Zealand women nurses
Scottish emigrants to New Zealand